Tele Vida Abundante is a Spanish-language religious network with low-powered television affiliates across certain areas of the United States, mostly in the west.

The network also broadcasts on free-to-air satellites Sat-Mex 5, covering from southern Canada to Argentina.

List of Affiliates

Most channels listed here are low-powered and currently analog only, with no digital signals.

External links
Official Site

Religious television stations in the United States
Spanish-language television networks in the United States
Television channels and stations established in 1985
1985 establishments in the United States